Lignano may refer to:

 Lignano Pineta, frazione of the city of Lignano Sabbiadoro, comune in the province of Udine, in the Friuli-Venezia Giulia 
 Lignano Riviera, frazione of the city of Lignano Sabbiadoro, comune in the province of Udine, in the Friuli-Venezia Giulia region of north-eastern Italy
 Lignano Sabbiadoro, town and comune within the province of Udine, in the Friuli Venezia Giulia region of north-eastern Italy.
 Ferdinando Lignano, Italian water polo player
 Giuseppe Lignano, Italian-born architect